Emmanuel John Nchimbi (born 24 December 1971) is a Tanzanian CCM politician and was a Member of Parliament for Songea Town constituency from 2010 to 2015. Currently, he is Tanzania's ambassador to Egypt. He was the Minister of Home Affairs.

References

1971 births
Living people
Chama Cha Mapinduzi MPs
Tanzanian MPs 2005–2010
Tanzanian MPs 2010–2015
Government ministers of Tanzania
Sangu Secondary School alumni
Forest Hill Secondary School alumni
Mzumbe University alumni
Ambassadors of Tanzania